The secretary of public works and highways (Filipino: Kalihim ng mga Pagawain at Lansangang Bayan) is the head of the Department of Public Works and Highways in the national government of the Philippines, and is a member of the president’s Cabinet.

The current secretary is Manuel Bonoan, who assumed office on June 30, 2022.

List of secretaries of public works and highways

External links
DPWH website

References

 
Philippines
Public Works and Highways